The 2015–16 season is Hartlepool United's 107th year in existence and their third consecutive season in League Two. Along with competing in League Two, the club will also participate in the FA Cup, League Cup and League Trophy. The season covers the period from 1 July 2015 to 30 June 2016.

Players

Transfers

Transfers in

Loans in

Transfers out

Loans out

Competitions

Pre-season friendlies
On 27 May 2015, Hartlepool United announced their first pre-season friendly against Chesterfield. On 11 June 2015, Hartlepool United announced another three pre-season matches. A day later, Hartlepool United confirmed a further four friendlies.

League Two

League table

Results summary

Results by matchday

Matches
On 17 June 2015, the fixtures for the forthcoming season were announced.

FA Cup
On 26 October 2015, the first round draw was made, Hartlepool United were drawn at home against Cheltenham Town.

League Cup
On 16 June 2015, the first round draw was made, Hartlepool United were drawn away against Fleetwood Town.

Football League Trophy
On 8 August 2015, the draw for the first round of the Football League Trophy was drawn by Toni Duggan and Alex Scott live on Soccer AM.

Squad statistics

Appearances and goals

|}

Goalscorers

Clean Sheets

Penalties

Suspensions

Awards

Club Awards
On 4 May 2016, Hartlepool United held their annual club awards night at The Grand Hotel, Hartlepool.

References

Hartlepool United
Hartlepool United F.C. seasons
2010s in County Durham